Ram Kinkar Upadhyay (1924-2002) was a noted scholar on Indian scriptures and a recipient of Padma Bhushan in 1999. He was born on 1 November 1924 and died in 2002.

Publications 
Manas Charitavali
Manas Muktavali
Sugreev aur Vibhishan
krodh
Vijay, Vivek aur Vibhooti
Premmurti Bharat
Krupa
Parashuram Samvad
Bhagwan Shriram Satya ya Kalpana
Navdha Bhakti
Manas Pravachan

References

External links
 http://www.ramkinker.com

People from Uttar Pradesh
Recipients of the Padma Bhushan in other fields
People from Jabalpur
1924 births
2002 deaths